Dhaka Second Division Football League is the fourth-tier football league in Bangladesh, and the second highest league division in Dhaka. The league was officially founded in 1948 as the second-tier of the Dhaka League, while Bangladesh were still under the control of Pakistan. Until 1992, it was the second-tier of Bangladeshi football, before being replaced by the now defunct Dhaka First Division Football League, in 1993. In 2012, the league was further demoted into becoming the country's fourth-tier. The two top-finishing teams in the Super League round are automatically promoted to the Dhaka Senior Division League (Dhaka League). The league is run by the Dhaka Metropolition Football Committee under the supervision of Bangladesh Football Federation (BFF).

History

With there being records of a Dhaka Football League system, which included a Second Division being present in 1915 during Bengal Presidency, it was in 1948, when the Dhaka Sporting Association officially established a three-tiered football league system in Dhaka, East Bengal and thus, the Dhaka Second Division Football League was formed as the second-tier in the system. It is placed below the Dhaka League and above the Dhaka Third Division League. Many well known clubs in Bangladesh entered football directly through the Second Division, such as Azad Sporting Club who first played Dhaka Second Division in 1949, earned promotion to the Dhaka League within two seasons, and eventually became top-tier champions by 1958.

In 1993, the Bangladesh Football Federation (BFF) introduced the Dhaka First Division Football League as the new 2nd-tier and renamed the Dhaka League as the Premier Division Football League. This meant that the Dhaka Second Division Football League would shift down a tier, becoming the third-tier football league in Bangladesh and the third highest league division in Dhaka.

In 2007, with the introduction of the country's first wide open national football league, the Bangladesh Premier League, Dhaka football system was altered again, as the Dhaka First Division Football League was merged to the Dhaka Premier Division League (Dhaka League) and became the 2nd-tier known as the Dhaka Senior Division Football League. Although, the Dhaka Second Division Football League returned to being the second highest league division in Dhaka, it remained as Bangladesh's third-tier until the  further introduction of a new second-tier in 2012, known as the Bangladesh Championship League, the second wide open national football league in the country, which had the league become the fourth-tier of Bangladeshi football.

Format

18 clubs all from Dhaka take part in the league.
Clubs are divided into two groups of 9 teams.
The clubs who finish in the first five spots of the table from each group qualify for the Super League round. While the clubs who finish bottom of each group are relegated to the Dhaka Third Division Football League, which is the fifth-tier of Bangladeshi football.
A total of 10 teams make up the Super League, and contest in a single round league, with the winners and runners-up being promoted to the next edition of the Dhaka Senior Division Football League.

Structure

Champions

Second-tier league: 1948–1992

Third-tier league: 1993–2011

Fourth-tier league: 2012–present

Top scorers

Match-Fixing

2017
On 8 June 2017, Bangladesh Football Federation relegated Dhaka United Sports Club and Friends Social Welfare Organisation during the 2016–17 league after both clubs were found guilty of playing a fixed match. They were both fined Tk 50000, while three of the Dhaka United Sports Club players were suspended for different terms following their involvement in the fixed-match which led to Friends Social Welfare Organisation winning the game and thus avoiding relegation.

2021–22
On 10 November 2022, Bangladesh Football Federation found both BG Press Sports and Recreation Club and Khilgaon Football Academy guilty of match-fixing. Both clubs were also fined Tk5 lakhs each. BG Press had three points deducted, while the club general secretary, Shikdar Moshiur Rahman, head coach Md Delowar Hossain and team manager Md Rafiqul Islam Sarkar, were banned from football activities for six months. Five players of BG Press – Salman Rahman, Mostafizur Rahman, Shahin Alam Pranto, Swadhin Biswas and Mehedi Hasan were also banned for six months, while Md Tanis Mia has been suspended for three months. Khilgaon Football Academy were already relegated from the league, and the club's  president Hazi Md Nazrul Islam, general secretary Md Rafiqul Islam, head coach Md Habibur Rahman and team manager Faruk Ahmed were banned from taking part in football activities for six months.

References

Dhaka Second Division Football League
3
Sport in Dhaka
1948 establishments in East Pakistan
Professional sports leagues in Bangladesh
Fourth level football leagues in Asia
Sports leagues established in 1948